Discheramocephalus elisabethae is a species of feather-winged beetle, the smallest beetles on earth, first found in Cameroon.

References

Further reading
Grebennikov, Vasily V. "Discheramocephalini, a new pantropical tribe of featherwing beetles (Coleoptera: Ptiliidae): description of new taxa and phylogenetic analysis." Systematic Entomology 34.1 (2009): 113–136.

Endemic fauna of Cameroon
Ptiliidae
Beetles described in 2007